Brandon Baddock (born March 29, 1995) is a Canadian professional ice hockey winger for the Iowa Wild in the American Hockey League (AHL), while under contract to the Minnesota Wild in the National Hockey League (NHL). He was drafted 161st overall by the New Jersey Devils in the sixth round of the 2014 NHL Entry Draft and formerly played for the Binghamton Devils and Laval Rocket.

Playing career

Junior 

After playing minor hockey in the Alberta Major Bantam Hockey League (AMBHL), Baddock was drafted 134th overall by the Edmonton Oil Kings in the seventh round of the 2010 WHL Bantam Draft. He played two more seasons in the Alberta Minor Midget Hockey League (AMMHL) and in the Alberta Junior Hockey League (AJHL) before making his Western Hockey League (WHL) debut.

Baddock made his WHL debut on November 19, 2011, in a 5–2 loss against the Lethbridge Hurricanes. In his second WHL appearance on September 20, 2012, he scored his first WHL goal in a 5–3 win against the Kootenay Ice. Overall, he played 59 games with seven goals and four assists in his rookie WHL season, en route to a WHL Championship final appearance. In the 2013–14 WHL season, he played 56 games with six goals and 11 assists, en route to the Oil Kings' fourth Ed Chynoweth Cup and first Memorial Cup. Prior to the 2014–15 WHL season, Baddock was named alternate captain of the Oil Kings, scoring 19 goals and 21 assists in 71 games played. In his final WHL season, he was selected as captain, scoring 22 goals and 13 assists in 68 games played.

Professional 

After being drafted 161st overall by the New Jersey Devils in the sixth round of the 2014 NHL Entry Draft, Baddock signed a three-year entry-level contract with the Devils on June 1, 2016.

On January 29, 2017, the Devils' AHL affiliate, the Albany Devils, reassigned him to their ECHL affiliate, the Adirondack Thunder. The same day, he made his professional debut for the Thunder, in a 3–2 win against the Elmira Jackals. He ultimately appeared in 21 games with four assists in his rookie professional season for the Thunder. On October 7, 2017, he made his AHL debut for the Binghamton Devils in a 2–1 win against the Bridgeport Sound Tigers. On October 28, 2017, he scored his first professional goal in a 2–1 win against the Springfield Thunderbirds, playing 53 games with three goals and four assists in the 2017–18 AHL season. The following season, he played 67 games with three goals, seven assists and was the 2018–19 AHL season penalty infraction minute leader.

On July 15, 2019, the New Jersey Devils re-signed Baddock to a one-year two-way contract. He played 50 games with six goals and nine assists in the shortened AHL season.

On October 9, 2020, the Montreal Canadiens signed Baddock to a one-year two-way contract. He was promoted to the Canadiens' taxi squad in the 2020–21 season, however, he never appeared in an NHL game. He also appeared in 25 games with two goals and three assists for the Canadiens' AHL affiliate, Laval Rocket, in the 2020–21 AHL season.

On July 27, 2021, the Canadiens re-signed Baddock to a one-year two-way contract. After injuries and a COVID-19 outbreak on the Canadiens' roster, he made his NHL debut on December 30, 2021, in a 4–0 loss against the Carolina Hurricanes. He was placed on the COVID-19 protocol the following day.

On February 12, 2022, Baddock was traded by the Canadiens to the Minnesota Wild in exchange for Andrew Hammond.

Career statistics

References

External links 

 

1995 births
Living people
Adirondack Thunder players
Binghamton Devils players
Canadian ice hockey left wingers
Edmonton Oil Kings players
Iowa Wild players
Laval Rocket players
Montreal Canadiens players
New Jersey Devils draft picks